The position of Lord Mayor of Stoke-on-Trent is largely ceremonial, determined by a vote amongst the elected councillors of Stoke-on-Trent City Council. Candidates are selected from the councillors. The lord mayor for 2022 to 2023 is Faisal Hussain, a Conservative.

History
Between 1910 and 1928 the Borough, and later, City of Stoke-on-Trent had a mayor rather than a lord mayor. The first Mayor of Stoke-on-Trent was Cecil Wedgwood of the Wedgwood pottery dynasty. The title of Lord Mayor was first conferred on the City of Stoke-on-Trent by King George V on 10 July 1928.

List of former mayors
1901-02 T. R. Yoxall (Conservative)
1902-03 T. R. Yoxall (re-elected)

List of former lord mayors

21st century
2000-01 Barbara Dunn (Labour) 
2001-02 Bill Austin (Labour)  (2nd Term)
2002-03 Ellis Bevan (Liberal Democrat) 
2003-04 Clive Brian (Conservative) 
2004-05 Karamat Ali (Labour) 
2005-06 Maurice Lewis (Labour) 
2006-07 Jean Edwards (Labour) 
2007-08 Bagh Ali (Labour) 
2008-09 Derek Capey (City Independent) 
2009-10 Jean Bowers (Liberal Democrat) (1st term)
2010-11 Denver Tolley (Labour) 
2011-12 Terry Follows (City Independent) 
2012-13 Terry Crowe (Labour) 
2013-14 Sheila Pitt (Labour) 
2014-15 Majid Khan (Labour) 
2015–16 Jean Bowers (City Independent) (2nd term)
2016–17 Anthony Munday (City Independent)
2017–18 Ross Irving (Conservative and Independent Alliance) (1st term)
2018–19 Lilian Dodd (City Independent)
2019–20 Jackie Barnes (City Independent)
2020–21 Ross Irving (Conservative and Independent Alliance) (2nd term)
2021–22 Chandra Kanneganti (Conservative)
2022–23 Faisal Hussain (Conservative)

References

Stoke-on-Trent
Ceremonial officers in the United Kingdom